The Gangster, the Cop, the Devil is a 2019 South Korean action thriller film directed by Lee Won-tae. The film stars Ma Dong-seok, Kim Mu-yeol and Kim Sung-kyu. The narrative revolves around three characters: a serial killer, the gangster who was almost a victim of the killer and the cop who wants to arrest the killer. The cop and the gangster decide to join forces to catch the killer, but face challenges from their respective enemies at work.

The film was released theatrically in South Korea on 15 May 2019, and was also screened in the "Midnight Screenings" section at the 2019 Cannes Film Festival as well as at the 2019 Fantasia International Film Festival.

Plot
A man's car is hit by a stranger who kills him when he takes pictures of the damage for claiming car insurance. Jung Tae-suk is a cop, who goes through the crime scene and suspects it to be the work of a serial killer, but his senior does not believe him. Jang Dong-soo is a crime boss, while on his way home after a meeting. The same killer hits his car and eventually tries to kill him. A brutal fight ensues, leaving both of them injured. Finally, the killer escapes after knocking Dong-soo with his car. Dong-soo is admitted to the hospital, and his henchmen assume that the attack was committed by a rival gang, whom they counter-attack.

However, Dong-soo believes the killer was not a rival gang member as his moves seemed to be random and purposeless. Tae-suk visits Dong-soo at the hospital and asks him to cooperate so that he can catch the killer for him, but Dong-soo does not comply. Instead, Dong-soo orders his men to find the killer through a sketch, and they manage to find his car and a knife. Dong-soo eventually informs Tae-suk of the findings, and they decide to team up to catch the mysterious killer. Dong-soo agrees to provide manpower and cover expenses — but on the condition that the killer belongs to the one who finds him first. Dong-soo wants to kill him for revenge while Tae-suk wants to arrest him in order to solve five connected murder cases and eventually get promoted.

Meanwhile, Dong-soo orders his right-hand man, Kwon Oh-sung, to kill his rival Heo Sang-do with the killer's knife that already has the blood imprints of the killer's previous victims. An enraged Tae-suk gets into a fight with Dong-soo upon learning what he has done as the killing is confirmed to be the serial killer's work and the case would get transferred to the major case squad. Dong-soo visits Sang-do's funeral where the killer also turns up informing Sang-do's second-in-command man that it was Dong-soo who actually killed Sang-do with the killer's knife. When Tae-suk and Dong-soo check the killer's car for any evidence, they are attacked by Sang-do's henchmen. A fight ensues, resulting in the death of Sang-do's right-hand man.

Dong-soo gets him buried and clears the scene. Tae-suk is now assigned to investigate a kidnapping case, and, while solving it, he spots the killer. A chase ensues, but the killer flees. Through the forensic test, Tae-suk discovers the killer to be a missing person. He informs Dong-soo about this and lets him hear a voice clip to confirm the missing person to be the killer. Later, Dong-soo helps a high school girl by giving her his umbrella and soon learns that the girl has been murdered and his umbrella was found at the crime scene. They start looking for the killer and eventually find him in a car. In an ensuing chase, the killer manages to kill Oh-sung but is finally captured and incapacitated by Dong-soo. Dong-soo takes the killer away to torture and kill him, but Tae-suk tracks them and crashes his car into the hideout, knocking Dong-soo unconscious and arresting the killer.

The police have no conclusive evidence against the killer, Kang Kyung-ho. As a last resort, Tae-suk asks Dong-soo, the sole survivor of the attacks, to testify. Simultaneously, Tae-suk threatens to release a tape of Dong-soo's confession of having Sang-do killed. During Kyung-ho's trial, Dong-soo arrives to testify and provides decisive testimony. Dong-soo successfully predicts the existence of a stab wound on Kyung-ho's body, previously inflicted by Dong-soo during their first encounter. Dong-soo also provides misleading evidence framing Kyung-ho for Sang-do's murder. The court sentences Kyung-ho to death; however, Dong-soo is also arrested due to his illegal activities.

Tae-suk is finally promoted while Dong-soo is sent to the prison where Kyung-ho is kept: The condition which Dong-soo had requested Tae-suk to fulfill in exchange for the testimony followed by his arrest. Spotting Kyung-ho, Dong-soo gleefully enters prison. While Kyung-ho is showering, he is confronted by Dong-soo. With a rope in his hand and a smile on his face, Dong-soo tells Kyung-ho that the game ends.

Cast
 Ma Dong-seok as Jang Dong-soo
 Kim Mu-yeol as Jung Tae-suk
 Kim Sung-kyu as Kang Kyung-ho (K)
 Choi Min-chul as Kwon Oh-sung
 Heo Dong-won as Choi Moon-sik
 Yoo Jae-myung as Heo Sang-do (special appearance)
 Yoo Seung-mok as Ahn Ho-bong
 Oh Hee-joon as Kim Dong-chul
 Cha Soon-bae as Supreme Court Justice
 Park Bo-kyung as Victim's wife
 Lee Eun-saem as High school student

Production

Filming
Principal photography began on July 31, 2018, and wrapped on November 18, 2018.

Release 
The Gangster, the Cop, The Devil was released in South Korea on May 15, 2019. The film will also be shown out of competition in the Midnight Screenings section at the 2019 Cannes Film Festival.

Reception

Critical response
The film received positive critical reviews. On review aggregator Rotten Tomatoes, the film has a rating of  based on  reviews. The critics consensus states, "An odd couple cop thriller with a twist, The Gangster, The Cop, The Devil tells its entertaining story with a blend of humour and hard-hitting action." On review aggregator website Metacritic, the film has a weighted average score of 65 out of 100 based on seven critics, indicating "generally favourable reviews".

Leslie Felperin of The Guardian stated "Although its final act shreds credulity, and the structure is a bit wonky, this pulpy crime thriller from Korea is still a real kick in the head. Like so many of the genre that hail from Seoul and its suburbs, this one punches well above its weight with an inventive reworking of well-worn plot tropes and slick production values." Jessica Kiang of Variety commented "Korea has dominated the midnight-movie/genre slots at international festivals so thoroughly of late that it's hard not to view Lee Won-tae's "The Gangster, the Cop, the Devil" in terms of its shortcomings in comparison to the likes of "Train to Busan", "The Age of Shadows", "The Wailing" and so on. But what this fun, slick but slightly forgettable hardboiled actioner lacks in terms of the energy, originality and inventiveness of a true Korean genre classic, it almost makes up for as a showcase for the burly charisma of star Don Lee, aka Ma Dong-Seok." Cary Darling of Houston Chronicle added "Director/writer Lee Won-tae, for whom this is only his second feature, keeps the pace moving swiftly with this cats-and-mouse game, showing off an energetic sensibility that heralds a new voice on the South Korean film scene. It's no wonder that "The Gangster, The Cop, The Devil", which was invited for a midnight-screening slot at the recently concluded Cannes Film Festival, has been picked up by Hollywood for an English-language remake with Sylvester Stallone producing."

David Ehrlich of IndieWire noted "In broad strokes, this premise has already been explored to death, but "The Gangster, the Cop, the Devil" breathes new life into it by elevating at least two of its three major characters far above their archetypes." Michael Leader of Little White Lies wrote "While not wildly original – Asian crime cinema has mined these uncommon team-ups and ethical ambiguities for decades – The Gangster, the Cop, the Devil pulls off its familiar twists and turns with style and verve. An expansive, electric-neon aerial shot at the start of the film places us firmly in Michael Mann territory, and the machismo of the film's protagonists spills over into director Lee Won-tae's amped-up aesthetic, from flashy scene transitions and montages to generous helpings of slow-mo, crunchy fight choreography and a driving rock soundtrack throughout. The film is slick, stylish and consistently entertaining, but it would be nothing without its headline lead performances." Richard Whittaker of Austin Chronicle wrote "Yes, it's car crashes and fight sequences and dry jokes, but it's a mix that will make you wow, wince and guffaw in just the right amounts, all carried off with a gritty style. It may lull a little in the final act, but that's just setting up one of the decade's low-key finest payoffs." Ben Travis of Empire wrote "There's not much going on beneath the energetic surface, but for the most part The Gangster, The Cop, The Devil is a fast-paced, entertaining thriller buoyed by two engaging leads". Trevor Johnson of Time Out gave the film three stars out of five, commenting "This muscular South Korean crime thriller is neon-lit catnip for fans of the genre... A solid, if not quite exceptional, time-passer". Jason Gorber of /Film gave the film 6.5 point of 10, stating "As it stands, this is a movie with a great idea and pretty decent execution, one where the fists fly, the cars crash, and you actually care about the characters involved. With a bit of tweaking, especially with regard to the Devil character to make him (or her!) more chilling and compelling, there's the opportunity to up the ante even further and craft a magnificent film. For now, we've got a great bit of genre fun, a movie that at once evokes the rich history of this kind of film with its iconic character types, yet does so with enough originality and confidence to make The Gangster, The Cop, The Devil a powerful tale of its own".

Remake 
On 5 May 2019, it was announced that Sylvester Stallone and his Balboa Productions partner Braden Aftergood will produce the US remake of The Gangster, the Cop, the Devil, with Ma Dong-seok reprising his role and producing the film under BA Entertainment.

References

External links

2019 films
2019 action thriller films
Films about police officers
Films about criminals
Films about murder
Films set in prison
Films set in Seoul
2010s Korean-language films
South Korean action thriller films
South Korean crime action films
South Korean films about revenge
South Korean serial killer films
South Korean films based on actual events
2010s South Korean films